Doug Lloyd  (born August 31, 1965) is a former running back in the National Football League. He was a member of the Los Angeles Raiders during the 1991 NFL season. Previously, he had been drafted in the sixth round of the 1989 NFL Draft by the Raiders.

He attended Beaver Dam High School in Beaver Dam, Wisconsin.

References

People from Beaver Dam, Wisconsin
People from River Falls, Wisconsin
Players of American football from Wisconsin
Los Angeles Raiders players
American football running backs
North Dakota State Bison football players
1965 births
Living people
Sportspeople from the Milwaukee metropolitan area